Palisade Nunatak is a substantial rock nunatak just north of Rohss Bay and 2 nautical miles (3.7 km) southeast of Hidden Lake on James Ross Island. Mapped from surveys by Falkland Islands Dependencies Survey (FIDS) (1960–61). This distinctive ridge-backed nunatak with vertical columnar structure is the largest outcrop of hard intrusive rock on James Ross Island. Named by United Kingdom Antarctic Place-Names Committee (UK-APC) for its resemblance to a palisade.

Nunataks of Graham Land
Landforms of James Ross Island